Charles Le Quintrec (14 March 1926 – 14 November 2008) was a French poet. He was born in Plescop and died in Lorient in Brittany.

Le Quintrec was a literary critic for Ouest-France .

Awards
 Chevalier des Arts et Lettres
 Officer of the Ordre national du Mérite
 Knight of the Legion of Honor
 Max Jacob Prize
 Apollinaire Prize
 Grand Prize for poetry of the Académie française
 Grand Prize of the Société des gens de lettres for his body of work,
 1990 Prix Goncourt poetry
 2007 Grand prix catholique de littérature

Works
 Les Enfants de Kerfontaine, Albin Michel, 2007
 Demain dès l'aube: Journal IV 1994-2004, Albin Michel, 2006
 Terre océane, Albin Michel, 2006
 Le Pèlerin de Saint-Roch, Albin Michel, 2004 et Le Livre De Poche, 2006
 Un Breton à Paris, Albin Michel, 2002 et Libra Diffusio, 2004
 La Saison du bourreau, Albin Michel, 2001
 La Fête bretonne, Ouest-France, 2000
 L'Enfant de Brocéliande, Albin Michel, 2000
 Une Enfance bretonne, Albin Michel, 2000 et Le Livre De Poche, 2002
 Des Matins dans les ronces, Albin Michel, 2000
 Vents d'étoiles, Liv'Editions, 1998
 Danses et chants pour Elisane, Albin Michel, 1998
 L'Empire des fougères, Albin Michel, 1998 et Le Livre De Poche, 2000
 L'Espérance de la nuit: Journal, 1985-1993, Albin Michel, 1996
 La Traversée du lac, Albin Michel, 1995
 Littérature de Bretagne, Ouest-France, 1992
 Des Enfants de lumière, Albin Michel, 1992 et Liv'Editions, 1995
 La Querelle de Dieu, Albin Michel, 1992 et Le Livre De Poche, 2000
 Belle-Ile en mer, Ed. Maritimes et d'Outre Mer, 1991
 La Source et le Secret, Albin Michel, 1990
 Les Nuits du Parc-Lann, Albin Michel, 1990 et Le Livre De Poche, 2000
 Bretagne est univers, Ouest-France, 1988
 Les Lumières du soir: journal, 1980-1985, Albin Michel, 1987
 Chanticoq, Albin Michel, 1986 et Le Livre De Poche, 2000
 Les Ombres du jour, Albin Michel, 1985
 
 La Bretagne de Charles Le Quintrec, Christine Bonneton éditeur, 1984
 Le Règne et le royaume, Albin Michel, 1983
 Le Christ aux orties, Albin Michel, 1982
 The Stones of Carnac, Ouest-France, 1981
 Le Village allumé, Éditions Saint-Germain-des-Prés, 1981
 La Lumière et l'argile, 1981 et Albin Michel, 2000
 Anthologie de la poésie bretonne 1880-1980, Table ronde, 1980
 Les Grandes heures littéraires de Bretagne, Ouest-France, 1978
 Le Château d'amour, Albin Michel, 1977
 Jeunesse de Dieu, Albin Michel, 1974
 La Ville en loques, Albin Michel, 1972
 La Marche des arbres, Albin Michel, 1970 Grand prix international de poésie
 Un Buisson d'alléluias, 1969
 Les Grands habits, Subervie, 1968
 Stances du verbe Amour, Albin Michel, 1966
 Le Chemin noir, Albin Michel, 1968
 Le Mur d'en face, Le Cercle du Nouveau Livre, 1965
 Alain Bosquet, Seghers, 1964
 La Maison du Moustoir, Albin Michel, 1964
 Le Droit au témoignage, 1963
 La Lampe du corps, Albin Michel, 1962
 Le Dieu des chevaux, Albin Michel, 1962
 Les Chemins de Kergrist, Albin Michel, 1959 et 1996
 Les Noces de la terre, Grasset, 1957
 Les Temps obscurs, René Debresse Éditeur, 1953

External links 
"Charles Le Quintrec est mort à 82 ans", Nouvelle Observateur, Sylvie Prioul, 25/11/2008

1926 births
2008 deaths
People from Morbihan
Prix Goncourt de la Poésie winners
Officers of the Ordre national du Mérite
Chevaliers of the Ordre des Arts et des Lettres
Chevaliers of the Légion d'honneur
French male poets
20th-century French poets
Winners of the Prix Broquette-Gonin (literature)
20th-century French male writers
Prix Guillaume Apollinaire winners